The 1907 New Zealand rugby union tour of Australia was the sixth tour by the New Zealand national team to Australia. Four matches were played against regional and district sides along with three Test match against the Australia national side, being the first time both teams played each other.

New Zealand won the series with two victories and a tied match. Before the tour matches, New Zealand played a preliminary game v. the Wellington RU team at the Athletic Park, won by the All Blacks 19–6.

Match summary 
Complete list of matches played by the All Blacks in Australia:

 Test matches

Match details

Waratahs

Waratahs

Australia

Reds

Reds

Australia

Australia

References

New Zealand
Tour
Tour
New Zealand national rugby union team tours of Australia